Nitzan Yehuda Hanochi (born 10 June 1986) is an Israeli professional basketball player who last played for Bnei Herzliya of the Israeli Basketball Premier League. He was named the Israeli Basketball Premier League Most Improved Player in 2011, and the Israeli Basketball Premier League Defensive Player of the Year in 2012.

Early life
Hanochi was born in Ra'anana, he played for Maccabi Ra'anana youth teams.

Hanochi also played high school basketball for Metro West High School team in Ra'anana and led them to win the national championship in the 2003–04 season.

Professional career
In 2004, Hanochi started his professional career with Bnei Hasharon, but later was loaned to Maccabi Giva'at Shmuel.

On July 27, 2006, Hanochi signed a two-year contract extension with Bnei Hasharon.

On July 5, 2008, Hanochi signed with Ironi Nahariya for the 2008–09 season, joining his former head coach Yakov Gino.

On August 13, 2009, Hanochi signed with Hapoel Afula for the 2009–10 season.

On July 5, 2010, Hanochi signed a three-year deal with Maccabi Rishon LeZion, under head coach Effi Birnbaum. On February 12, 2011, Hanochi was named Player of the Month for games played in January. On May 19, 2011, Hanochi was named Most Improved Player of the 2010–11 Israeli League season. In his second season with Rishon LeZion, Hanochi became the team's captain and later was named Israeli League All-Star and the Defensive Player of the Year.

On July 9, 2013, Hanochi signed with Hapoel Eilat for the 2013–14 season.

On July 9, 2014, Hanochi returned for a second stint in Maccabi Rishon LeZion, signing a two-year contract.

On March 14, 2016, Hanochi signed a two-year contract extension with Rishon LeZion. That season, Hanochi helped Rishon LeZion to win the 2016 Israeli League Championship.

On December 18, 2017, Hanochi missed Rishon LeZion's game against Bnei Herzliya due to injury, Hanochi's absence ended his streak of consecutive games played at 242—the longest longest streak in the history of the Israeli Basketball Premier League.

On July 12, 2018, Hanochi returned to Bnei Herzliya for a second stint, signing a three-year deal.

Israeli national team
Hanochi was a member of the Israeli national team at the Eurobasket 2013.

Hanochi was also a member of the Israeli Under-18  and Under-20 national teams.

References

External links
 RealGM Profile

1986 births
Living people
Bnei HaSharon players
Bnei Hertzeliya basketball players
Hapoel Afula players
Hapoel Eilat basketball players
Israeli Basketball Premier League players
Israeli men's basketball players
Ironi Nahariya players
Maccabi Givat Shmuel players
Maccabi Rishon LeZion basketball players
Shooting guards
Sportspeople from Ra'anana